The Yorkshire (West Riding) Electric Tramways  operated two separate tramway services. One in Wakefield between 1904 and 1932, and the other between Normanton, Pontefract and Castleford between 1906 and 1932

Yorkshire (West Riding) Electric Tramways

Operated out of a depot in Castleford, this route ran as follows: Normanton High Street – Whitwood Common – Hightown – Castleford Station – Castleford town centre – Glasshoughton – Pontefract Tanshelf – Pontefract Market Place. Service started on 29 October 1906.

Wakefield and District Light Railway

The Wakefield and District Light Railway operated a network of three tramway lines in Wakefield, centred on the Bull Ring. Services started 15 August 1904 with tramway cars obtained from Electric Railway and Tramway Carriage Works.

Closure

Services ended on 25 July 1932.

References

External links
 Yorkshire (West Riding) Electric Tramways Company at British Tramway Company Badges and Buttons
 Wakefield and District Light Railways at British Tramway Company Badges and Buttons

Tram transport in England
Transport in the City of Wakefield